The 37mm marsh mortar was a compact commando mortar developed by the Iranian Army during the Iran–Iraq War. It is very similar in concept to the World War II Soviet 37mm spade mortar. Though not officially designated as marsh mortar, the term is used by academics in describing this mortar.

Though small for a mortar, 37mm was the maximum shell size for which recoil did not drive the mortar into the soft ground.

Notes and sources

Mortars of Iran
Infantry mortars
37 mm artillery
Military equipment introduced in the 1980s